Codsall is a civil parish in the district of South Staffordshire, Staffordshire, England. It contains 20 listed buildings that are recorded in the National Heritage List for England. Of these, one is at Grade II*, the middle of the three grades, and the others are at Grade II, the lowest grade. The parish contains the villages of Codsall and Oaken, and the surrounding countryside. Most of the listed buildings are houses and associated structures, cottages, farmhouses and farm buildings, and the others include a church, a cross base and memorials in the churchyard, two mileposts, and a railway bridge and a railway station.


Key

Buildings

References

Citations

Sources

Lists of listed buildings in Staffordshire